Podagatlapalle is a village in Ravulapalem Mandal, Dr. B.R. Ambedkar Konaseema district in the state of Andhra Pradesh in India.

Geography 

Demographics 
 India census, Podagatlapalle had a population of 6,797, out of which 3,378 were male and 3,419 were female. The population of children below 6 years of age was 10%. The literacy rate of the village was 66%.

References 

Villages in Ravulapalem mandal